Mehul Kajaria is an Indian television actor.

Television

References 

Indian male soap opera actors
Indian male television actors
Living people
Male actors from Mumbai
21st-century Indian male actors
Male actors in Hindi television
Year of birth missing (living people)